New Cambria is a city in Saline County, Kansas, United States.  As of the 2020 census, the population of the city was 106.

History
New Cambria was named after Cambria County, Pennsylvania, the native home of an early settler.

The first post office in New Cambria was established in June 1873.

Geography
New Cambria is located at  (38.878504, -97.505730).

Demographics

It is part of the Salina Micropolitan Statistical Area.

2010 census
As of the census of 2010, there were 126 people, 56 households, and 37 families living in the city. The racial makeup of the city was 96.8% White, 0.8% Native American, and 2.4% from two or more races. Hispanic or Latino of any race were 0.8% of the population.

There were 56 households, of which 21.4% had children under the age of 18 living with them, 50.0% were married couples living together, 10.7% had a female householder with no husband present, 5.4% had a male householder with no wife present, and 33.9% were non-families. 30.4% of all households were made up of individuals, and 7.2% had someone living alone who was 65 years of age or older. The average household size was 2.25 and the average family size was 2.81.

The median age in the city was 46 years. 17.5% of residents were under the age of 18; 8.8% were between the ages of 18 and 24; 21.4% were from 25 to 44; 33.4% were from 45 to 64; and 19% were 65 years of age or older. The gender makeup of the city was 51.6% male and 48.4% female.

2000 census
As of the census of 2000, there were 150 people, 57 households, and 44 families living in the city. The racial makeup of the city was 96.67% White, 1.33% African American, and 2.00% from two or more races.

There were 57 households, out of which 36.8% had children under the age of 18 living with them, 59.6% were married couples living together, 12.3% had a female householder with no husband present, and 21.1% were non-families. 15.8% of all households were made up of individuals, and 1.8% had someone living alone who was 65 years of age or older. The average household size was 2.63 and the average family size was 2.89.

In the city, the population was spread out, with 27.3% under the age of 18, 7.3% from 18 to 24, 33.3% from 25 to 44, 22.7% from 45 to 64, and 9.3% who were 65 years of age or older. The median age was 36 years. For every 100 females, there were 123.9 males. For every 100 females age 18 and over, there were 113.7 males.

The median income for a household in the city was $36,607, and the median income for a family was $40,500. Males had a median income of $30,250 versus $23,125 for females. The per capita income for the city was $15,218. There were 2.0% of families and 5.5% of the population living below the poverty line, including 9.5% of under eighteens and none of those over 64.

Education
The community is served by Solomon USD 393 public school district.

References

Further reading

External links

 New Cambria - Directory of Public Officials
 Saline county map, KDOT

Cities in Kansas
Cities in Saline County, Kansas
Salina, Kansas micropolitan area
1873 establishments in Kansas
Populated places established in 1873